Lourinda Bray is an American restoration artist and historian with a specialty in carousel animals. She is also the owner of Running Horse Studios, a 7,000-square-foot carousel animal restoration warehouse. Her collection exceeds 400 and spans animals created throughout America, Mexico, and Europe from the mid-19th century to the present day. In addition to carousel figures, she has collected and restored other parts of carousels such as decorative mirrors, placards, base boards, and benches. Her collection also includes carousel-themed toys, postcards, and miniatures. The collection is sourced from numerous carousel carvers from the Golden Age  of carousels such as Herschell-Spillman, Charles Carmel, Charles Looff, E. Joy Morris, M.C. Illions & Sons Carousell Works, Philadelphia Toboggan Company, Dentzel Carousel Company, C.W. Parker Amusement Company, W.P. Wilcox, Josef Hübner, D.C. Muller Brothers, J.R. Anderson, Stein & Goldstein, Charles W. Dare, Orton Sons & Spooner, Daniel C. Muller & Bro, Bayol Carousel Company, Limonaire Frères, Carl Müller, and Daniel Hegereda.

Bray has co-hosted the National Carousel Association's Technical Assistance Conference due to her expertise and curated two major exhibitions of her restoration work at the Pasadena Museum of History.

Early life and education
Bray was inspired by carousel animals from a young age, particularly when she saw the famous Griffith Park carousel when she was five. She liked to draw horses and wanted to ride live ones but was allergic, making being in their presence difficult. The next best approximation were carousel horses, which Bray rode whenever possible.

Bray earned her bachelor's degree in painting and a Master's in stagecraft, specifically set design and special effects for television, including light design.

Career 
In the late 1970s, Bray began purchasing carousel animals to restore with funds she had inherited and invested. Her first purchase was a figure from the Kiddieland Carousel at the Pomona Fair. A major restoration effort was undertaken when, after 14 years of working on it, Bray purchased the Santa's Village Carousel.

Bray founded her studio in the early 1980s. She has amassed carousel figures of all kinds since, from serpents, zebras, tigers, camels, and roosters to dragons, witches, lions, peacocks, goats, and cats. Her oldest hand-carved animal is a tiger from 1875. Her holdings include pieces from the Knott's Berry Farm Lagoon Carousel; the estate of Swen Swenson, America's first collector of carousel pieces; the only known zebra carved by famous carousel carver Charles Carmel, and other curiosities.

Bray's restored animals have been the subject of two major exhibitions at the Pasadena Museum of History in Pasadena, California: Flying Horses and Mythical Beasts: The Magical World of Carousels and Giddy Up: Children Take the Reins.

References

Carousel designers
American women historians
Conservator-restorers
20th-century American women artists
21st-century American women artists
20th-century American historians
21st-century American historians
Year of birth missing (living people)
Living people